

Events

Pre-1600
503 BC – Roman consul Agrippa Menenius Lanatus celebrates a triumph for a military victory over the Sabines.
 190 – Dong Zhuo has his troops evacuate the capital Luoyang and burn it to the ground.
 611 – Maya king Uneh Chan of Calakmul sacks rival city-state Palenque in southern Mexico.
 801 – King Louis the Pious captures Barcelona from the Moors after a siege of several months.
1268 – A five-year Byzantine–Venetian peace treaty is concluded between Venetian envoys and Emperor Michael VIII Palaiologos.
1423 – Death of the Venetian Doge Tommaso Mocenigo, under whose rule victories were achieved against the Kingdom of Hungary and against the Ottoman Empire at the Battle of Gallipoli (1416).
1581 – Francis Drake is knighted by Queen Elizabeth I for completing a circumnavigation of the world.

1601–1900
1609 – Moriscos are expelled from the Kingdom of Valencia.
1660 – Declaration of Breda by King Charles II of Great Britain promises, among other things, a general pardon to all royalists and opponents of the monarchy for crimes committed during the English Civil War and the Interregnum.
1796 – Georges Cuvier delivers the first paleontological lecture.
1814 – Napoleon abdicates (conditionally) for the first time and names his son Napoleon II as Emperor of the French, followed by unconditional abdication two days later.
1818 – The United States Congress, affirming the Second Continental Congress, adopts the flag of the United States with 13 red and white stripes and one star for each state (20 at that time).
1841 – William Henry Harrison dies of pneumonia, becoming the first President of the United States to die in office, and setting the record for the briefest administration. Vice President John Tyler succeeds Harrison as President.
1865 – American Civil War: A day after Union forces capture Richmond, Virginia, U.S. President Abraham Lincoln visits the Confederate capital.
1866 – Alexander II of Russia narrowly escapes an assassination attempt by Dmitry Karakozov in the city of Saint Petersburg.
1887 – Argonia, Kansas elects Susanna M. Salter as the first female mayor in the United States.

1901–present
1905 – In India, an earthquake hits the Kangra Valley, killing 20,000, and destroying most buildings in Kangra, McLeod Ganj and Dharamshala.
1913 – First Balkan War: Greek aviator Emmanouil Argyropoulos becomes the first pilot to die in the Hellenic Air Force when his plane crashes.
1925 – The Schutzstaffel (SS) is founded under Adolf Hitler's Nazi Party in Germany.
1933 – U.S. Navy airship  is wrecked off the New Jersey coast due to severe weather.
1944 – World War II: First bombardment of oil refineries in Bucharest by Anglo-American forces kills 3000 civilians.
1945 – World War II: United States Army troops liberate Ohrdruf forced labor camp in Germany.
  1945   – World War II: United States Army troops capture Kassel.
  1945   – World War II: Soviet Red Army troops liberate Hungary from German occupation and occupy the country themselves. 
1946 – Greek judge and archeologist Panagiotis Poulitsas is appointed Prime Minister of Greece in the midst of the Greek Civil War.
1949 – Cold War: Twelve nations sign the North Atlantic Treaty creating the North Atlantic Treaty Organization.
1958 – The CND peace symbol is displayed in public for the first time in London.
1960 – France agrees to grant independence to the Mali Federation, a union of Senegal and French Sudan.
1963 – Bye Bye Birdie, a musical romantic comedy film directed by George Sidney, was released.
1964 – The Beatles occupy the top five positions on the Billboard Hot 100 pop chart.
1967 – Martin Luther King Jr. delivers his "Beyond Vietnam: A Time to Break Silence" speech in New York City's Riverside Church.
1968 – Martin Luther King Jr. is assassinated by James Earl Ray at a motel in Memphis, Tennessee.
  1968   – Apollo program: NASA launches Apollo 6.
1969 – Dr. Denton Cooley implants the first temporary artificial heart.
1973 – The Twin Towers of the World Trade Center in New York City are officially dedicated.
  1973   – A Lockheed C-141 Starlifter, dubbed the Hanoi Taxi, makes the last flight of Operation Homecoming.
1975 – Microsoft is founded as a partnership between Bill Gates and Paul Allen in Albuquerque, New Mexico.
  1975   – Vietnam War: A United States Air Force Lockheed C-5A Galaxy transporting orphans, crashes near Saigon, South Vietnam shortly after takeoff, killing 172 people.
1977 – Southern Airways Flight 242 crashes in New Hope, Paulding County, Georgia, killing 72.
1979 – Prime Minister Zulfikar Ali Bhutto of Pakistan is executed.
1981 – Iran–Iraq War: The Islamic Republic of Iran Air Force mounts an attack on H-3 Airbase and destroys about 50 Iraqi aircraft.
1983 – Space Shuttle program: Space Shuttle Challenger makes its maiden voyage into space on STS-6.
1984 – President Ronald Reagan calls for an international ban on chemical weapons.
1988 – Governor Evan Mecham of Arizona is convicted in his impeachment trial and removed from office.
1990 – The current flag of Hong Kong is adopted for post-colonial Hong Kong during the Third Session of the Seventh National People's Congress.
1991 – Senator John Heinz of Pennsylvania and six others are killed when a helicopter collides with their airplane over an elementary school in Merion, Pennsylvania.
  1991   – Forty-one people are taken hostage inside a Good Guys! Electronics store in Sacramento, California. 3 of the hostage takers and 3 hostages are killed
1994 – Three people are killed when KLM Cityhopper Flight 433 crashes at Amsterdam Airport Schiphol.
1996 – Comet Hyakutake is imaged by the USA Asteroid Orbiter Near Earth Asteroid Rendezvous.
2002 – The MPLA government of Angola and UNITA rebels sign a peace treaty ending the Angolan Civil War.
2009 – France announces its return to full participation of its military forces within NATO.
2010 – A magnitude 7.2 earthquake hits south of the Mexico-USA border, killing two and damaging buildings across the two countries. 
2013 – More than 70 people are killed in a building collapse in Thane, India.
2017 – Syria conducts an air strike on Khan Shaykhun using chemical weapons, killing 89 civilians. 
2020 – China holds a national day of mourning for martyrs who died in the fight against the novel coronavirus disease outbreak.

Births

Pre-1600
 188 – Caracalla, Roman emperor (d. 217)
1436 – Amalia of Saxony, Duchess of Bavaria-Landshut (d. 1501)
1490 – Vojtěch I of Pernstein, Bohemian nobleman (d. 1534)
1492 – Ambrosius Blarer, German-Swiss theologian and reformer (d. 1564)
1572 – William Strachey, English author (d. 1621)
1586 – Richard Saltonstall, English diplomat (d. 1661)
1593 – Edward Nicholas, English soldier and politician, Secretary of State for the Southern Department (d. 1669)

1601–1900
1640 – Gaspar Sanz, Spanish guitarist, composer, and priest (d. 1710)
1646 – Antoine Galland, French orientalist and archaeologist (d. 1715)
1648 – Grinling Gibbons, Dutch-English sculptor (d. 1721)
1676 – Giuseppe Maria Orlandini, Italian composer (d. 1760)
1688 – Joseph-Nicolas Delisle, French astronomer and cartographer (d. 1768)
1718 – Benjamin Kennicott, English theologian and scholar (d. 1783)
1752 – Niccolò Antonio Zingarelli, Italian composer (d. 1837)
1760 – Juan Manuel Olivares, Venezuelan organist and composer (d. 1797)
1762 – Stephen Storace, English actor and composer (d. 1796)
1772 – Nachman of Breslov, Ukrainian founder of the Breslov Hasidic movement (d. 1810)
1780 – Edward Hicks, American minister and painter (d. 1849)
1785 – Bettina von Arnim, German author, illustrator, and composer (d. 1859)
1792 – Thaddeus Stevens, American lawyer and politician (d. 1868)
1802 – Dorothea Dix, American nurse and activist (d. 1887)
1818 – Thomas Mayne Reid, Irish-American author and poet (d. 1883)
1819 – Maria II of Portugal (d. 1853)
1821 – Linus Yale Jr., American engineer and businessman (d. 1868)
1826 – Zénobe Gramme, Belgian engineer, invented the Gramme machine (d. 1901)
1829 – Owen Suffolk, Australian bushranger, poet, confidence-man and author (d. ?)
1835 – John Hughlings Jackson, English physician and neurologist (d. 1911)
1842 – Édouard Lucas, French mathematician and theorist (d. 1891)
1843 – William Henry Jackson, American painter and photographer (d. 1942)
1846 – Comte de Lautréamont, Uruguayan-French poet and educator (d. 1870)
1851 – James Campbell, 1st Baron Glenavy, Irish lawyer and politician (d. 1931)
1853 – Remy de Gourmont, French poet, novelist, and critic (d. 1915)
1868 – Philippa Fawcett, English mathematician and educator (d. 1948)
1869 – Mary Colter, American architect, designed the Desert View Watchtower (d. 1958)
1875 – Pierre Monteux, Sephardic Jewish French-American viola player and conductor (d. 1964)
1876 – Maurice de Vlaminck, French painter and poet (d. 1958)
1878 – Walter Conrad Arensberg, American art collector, critic and poet (d. 1954)
  1878   – Stylianos Lykoudis, Greek admiral and historian (d. 1958)
1879 – Gustav Goßler, German rower (d. 1940)
1884 – James Alberione, Italian priest, founded the Society of St. Paul (d. 1971)
  1884   – Isoroku Yamamoto, Japanese admiral (d. 1943)
1886 – Frank Luther Mott, American historian and journalist (d. 1964)
1888 – Tris Speaker, American baseball player and manager (d. 1958)
  1888   – Zdzisław Żygulski, Sr., Polish historian and academic (d. 1975)
1889 – Makhanlal Chaturvedi, Indian journalist, poet, and playwright (d. 1968)
1892 – Italo Mus, Italian painter (d. 1967)
  1892   – Edith Södergran, Swedish-Finnish poet (d. 1923)
1895 – Arthur Murray, American dancer and educator (d. 1991)
1896 – Robert E. Sherwood, American playwright and screenwriter (d. 1955)
1897 – Pierre Fresnay, French actor and screenwriter (d. 1975)
1898 – Agnes Ayres, American actress (d. 1940)
1899 – Hillel Oppenheimer, German-Israeli botanist and academic (d. 1971)

1901–present
1902 – Louise Lévêque de Vilmorin, French journalist and author (d. 1969)
  1902   – Stanley G. Weinbaum, American author and poet (d. 1935)
1905 – Eugène Bozza, French composer and conductor (d. 1991)
  1905   – Erika Nõva, Estonian architect and engineer (d. 1987)
1906 – Bea Benaderet, Turkish-Irish-American television, radio, and voice actress (d. 1968)
  1906   – John Cameron Swayze, American journalist (d. 1995)
1907 – Robert Askin, Australian sergeant and politician, 32nd Premier of New South Wales (d. 1981)
1910 – Đặng Văn Ngữ, Vietnamese physician and academic (d. 1967)
1913 – Dave Brown, Australian rugby league player (d. 1974)
  1913   – Rosemary Lane, American actress and singer (d. 1974)
  1913   – Frances Langford, American actress and singer (d. 2005)
  1913   – Jules Léger, Canadian lawyer and politician, 21st Governor General of Canada (d. 1980)
  1913   – Muddy Waters, American singer-songwriter and guitarist (d. 1983)
1914 – Richard Coogan, American actor (d. 2014)
  1914   – Marguerite Duras, French novelist, screenwriter, and director (d. 1996)
 1914    – David W. Goodall, Australian ecologist and botanist (d. 2018)
1915 – Louis Archambault, Canadian sculptor (d. 2003)
1916 – Nikola Ljubičić, Serbian general and politician, 10th President of Serbia (d. 2005)
  1916   – Mickey Owen, American baseball player and coach (d. 2005)
  1916   – David White, American actor (d. 1990)
1918 – George Jellicoe, 2nd Earl Jellicoe, English soldier and politician, Leader of the House of Lords (d. 2007)
1920 – Ignatius IV of Antioch, Greek patriarch (d. 2012)
1921 – Orunamamu, American-Canadian author and educator (d. 2014)
  1921   – Elizabeth Wilson, American actress (d. 2015)
1922 – Elmer Bernstein, American composer and conductor (d. 2004)
1923 – Peter Vaughan, English actor (d. 2016)
  1923   – Gene Reynolds, American actor, director, producer and screenwriter (d. 2020)
1924 – Bob Christie, American race car driver (d. 2009)
  1924   – Gil Hodges, American baseball player and manager (d. 1972)
1925 – Dettmar Cramer, German footballer and manager (d. 2015)
  1925   – Frank Truitt, American basketball player and coach (d. 2014)
  1925   – Claude Wagner, Canadian lawyer, judge, and politician (d. 1979)
  1925   – Emmett Williams, American poet and author (d. 2007)
  1926   – Ronnie Masterson, Irish actress (d. 2014)
1927 – Joe Orlando, Italian-American author and illustrator (d. 1998)
1928 – Maya Angelou, American memoirist and poet (d. 2014)
  1928   – Jimmy Logan, Scottish actor, director, and producer (d. 2001)
  1928   – Monty Norman, English singer-songwriter and producer (d. 2022)
1929 – Humbert Allen Astredo, American actor (d. 2016)
1930 – Netty Herawaty, Indonesian actress (d. 1989)
1931 – James Dickens, English politician (d. 2013)
  1931   – Bobby Ray Inman, American admiral and intelligence officer
  1931   – Catherine Tizard, New Zealand politician, 16th Governor-General of New Zealand (d. 2021)
1932 – Clive Davis, American record producer, founded Arista Records and J Records
  1932   – Richard Lugar, American lieutenant and politician, 44th Mayor of Indianapolis (d. 2019)
  1932   – Anthony Perkins, American actor (d. 1992)
  1932   – Johanna Reiss, Dutch-American author
  1932   – Andrei Tarkovsky, Russian director and producer (d. 1986)
1933 – Bill France Jr., American businessman (d. 2007)
  1933   – Brian Hewson, English runner (d. 2022)
  1933   – Bapu Nadkarni, Indian cricketer (d. 2020)
1934 – Helen Hanft, American actress (d. 2013)
  1934   – Kronid Lyubarsky, Russian journalist and activist (d. 1996)
1935 – Geoff Braybrooke, English-New Zealand soldier and politician (d. 2013)
  1935   – Kenneth Mars, American actor and comedian (d. 2011)
  1935   – Trevor Griffiths, English playwright and educator
1938 – A. Bartlett Giamatti, American businessman and academic (d. 1989)
1939 – JoAnne Carner, American golfer
  1939   – Darlene Hooley, American educator and politician
  1939   – Hugh Masekela, South African trumpeter, flugelhornist, cornetist, composer, and singer (d. 2018) 
1940 – Richard Attwood, English race car driver
  1940   – Sharon Sheeley, American singer-songwriter (d. 2002)
1941 – Zia Uddin, Bangladeshi Islamic scholar and politician
1942 – Jim Fregosi, American baseball player and manager (d. 2014)
  1942   – Kitty Kelley, American journalist and biographer
  1942   – Elizabeth Levy, American author
1944 – Magda Aelvoet, Belgian politician
  1944   – Mary Kenny, Irish journalist, author, and playwright
  1944   – Bob McDill, American country music songwriter
  1944   – Craig T. Nelson, American actor, director, producer, and screenwriter
  1944   – Nelson Prudêncio, Brazilian triple jumper and educator (d. 2012)
  1944   – Toktamış Ateş, Turkish academician, political commentator, columnist and writer (d. 2013)
1945 – Daniel Cohn-Bendit, French-German educator and politician
  1945   – Caroline McWilliams, American actress (d. 2010)
1946 – Colin Coates, Australian speed skater
  1946   – Dave Hill, English guitarist 
  1946   – Katsuaki Satō, Japanese martial artist and coach
  1946   – György Spiró, Hungarian author and playwright
  1946   – Bubba Wyche, American football player and coach
1947 – Wiranto, Indonesian general and politician
  1947   – Ray Fosse, American baseball player and sportscaster (d. 2021)
  1947   – Eliseo Soriano, Filipino minister and television host (d. 2021)
1948 – Abdullah Öcalan, Turkish activist
  1948   – Berry Oakley, American bass player (d. 1972)
  1948   – Richard Parsons, American lawyer and businessman
  1948   – Dan Simmons, American author
  1948   – Derek Thompson, Northern Irish actor
  1948   – Pick Withers, English drummer 
1949 – Junior Braithwaite, Jamaican-American singer (d. 1999)
  1949   – Litsa Diamanti, Greek singer 
  1949   – Shing-Tung Yau, Chinese-American mathematician and academic
1950 – Christine Lahti, American actress and director
1951 – John Hannah, American football player and coach
1952 – Rosemarie Ackermann, German high jumper
  1952   – Pat Burns, Canadian ice hockey player and coach (d. 2010)
  1952   – Gregg Hansford, Australian race car driver and motorcycle racer (d. 1995)
  1952   – Cherie Lunghi, English actress and dancer
  1952   – Karen Magnussen, Canadian figure skater and coach
  1952   – Gary Moore, Northern Irish singer-songwriter, guitarist, and producer (d. 2011)
  1952   – Villy Søvndal, Danish educator and politician, Danish Minister of Foreign Affairs
1953 – Robert Bertrand, Canadian politician
  1953   – Henry Fotheringham, South African cricketer
  1953   – Simcha Jacobovici, Canadian director, producer, journalist, and author
  1953   – Sammy Wilson, Northern Irish politician, 31st Lord Mayor of Belfast
  1953   – Chen Yi, Chinese violinist and composer
1956 – Evelyn Hart, Canadian ballerina
  1956   – Tom Herr, American baseball player and manager
  1956   – David E. Kelley, American screenwriter and producer
1957 – Paul Downton, English cricketer
  1957   – Aki Kaurismäki, Finnish director, producer, and screenwriter
  1957   – Graeme Kelling, Scottish guitarist (d. 2004)
  1957   – Nobuyoshi Kuwano, Japanese singer and trumpet player 
1958 – Peter Baltes, German bass player 
  1958   – Cazuza, Brazilian singer-songwriter (d. 1990)
  1958   – Rodney Eade, Australian footballer and coach
1959 – Phil Morris, American actor and screenwriter
1960 – Jonathan Agnew, English cricketer and sportscaster
  1960   – Jane Eaglen, English soprano
  1960   – Godknows Igali, Nigerian diplomat, civil servant and technocrat
  1960   – Hugo Weaving, Nigerian-Australian actor and producer
1961 – Hildi Santo-Tomas, American interior decorator
1962 – Craig Adams, English bass player and songwriter 
  1962   – Kailasho Devi, Indian social worker and politician
1963 – A. Michael Baldwin, American actor, producer, and screenwriter
  1963   – Jack Del Rio, American football player and coach
  1963   – Dale Hawerchuk, Canadian ice hockey player and coach (d. 2020)
  1963   – Jane McDonald, English singer and broadcaster
  1963   – Graham Norton, Irish actor and talk show host
1964 – Branco, Brazilian footballer and coach
  1964   – Dr. Chud, American drummer and singer
  1964   – Anthony Clark, American actor
  1964   – David Cross, American actor, producer, and screenwriter
  1964   – Satoshi Furukawa, Japanese surgeon and astronaut
  1964   – Paul Parker, England international footballer and TV pundit
  1964   – Đặng Thân, Vietnamese writer and poet 
1965 – Vinny Burns, English guitarist and producer 
  1965   – Robert Downey Jr., American actor, producer, and screenwriter
1966 – Nancy McKeon, American actress
  1966   – Mike Starr, American bass player (d. 2011)
  1966   – Christos Tsekos, Greek basketball player
1967 – Edith Masai, Kenyan-German runner
  1967   – George Mavrotas, Greek water polo player and politician
1968 – Jesús Rollán, Spanish water polo player (d. 2006)
1969 – Piotr Anderszewski, Polish pianist and composer
  1969   – Karren Brady, English journalist and businesswoman
1970 – Georgios Amanatidis, Greek footballer and manager
  1970   – Dimitris Basis, Greek singer 
  1970   – Greg Garcia, American director, producer, and screenwriter
  1970   – Barry Pepper, Canadian actor and producer
  1970   – Jason Stoltenberg, Australian tennis player
  1970   – Josh Todd, American singer-songwriter and actor
  1970   – Yelena Yelesina, Russian high jumper
1971 – Yanic Perreault, Canadian ice hockey player and coach 
  1971   – Malik Yusef, American actor, producer, and poet
  1971   – John Zandig, American wrestler and promoter
1972 – Jim Dymock, Australian rugby league player and coach
  1972   – Jill Scott, American singer-songwriter and actress
  1972   – Magnus Sveningsson, Swedish bass player 
1973 – Chris Banks, American football player (d. 2014)
  1973   – David Blaine, American magician and producer
  1973   – Loris Capirossi, Italian motorcycle racer
  1973   – Peter Hoekstra, Dutch footballer and coach
  1973   – Chris McCormack, Australian triathlete and coach
  1973   – Kelly Price, American singer-songwriter
1975 – Delphine Arnault, French businesswoman
  1975   – Thobias Fredriksson, Swedish skier
  1975   – Joyce Giraud, Puerto Rican television actress and producer, Miss Puerto Rico 1994
  1975   – Pamela Ribon, American actress, screenwriter, and author
  1975   – Miranda Lee Richards, American singer-songwriter
  1975   – Scott Rolen, American baseball player
  1975   – Kevin Weekes, Canadian ice hockey player and sportscaster
1976 – Nathan Blacklock, Australian rugby player
  1976   – Sébastien Enjolras, French race car driver (d. 1997)
  1976   – Emerson Ferreira da Rosa, Brazilian footballer
  1976   – James Roday, American actor, director, and screenwriter
1977 – Stephan Bonnar, American mixed martial artist (d. 2022)
  1977   – Keith Bulluck, American football player and sportscaster
  1977   – Adam Dutkiewicz, American guitarist, songwriter, and producer
  1977   – Stephen Mulhern, English magician and television host
  1977   – Omarr Smith, American football player and coach
1978 – Jason Ellison, American baseball player and scout
  1978   – Alan Mahon, Irish footballer
1979 – Heath Ledger, Australian actor (d. 2008)
  1979   – Roberto Luongo, Canadian ice hockey player
  1979   – Natasha Lyonne, American actress 
  1979   – Andy McKee, American guitarist
  1979   – Maksim Opalev, Russian canoeist
1980 – Johnny Borrell, English singer-songwriter and guitarist 
  1980   – Trevor Moore, American actor, director, producer, and screenwriter (d. 2021)
  1980   – Eric Steinbach, American football player
  1980   – Björn Wirdheim, Swedish race car driver
1981 – Currensy, American rapper 
  1981   – Eduardo Luís Carloto, Brazilian footballer
  1981   – Casey Daigle, American baseball player
  1981   – Anna Pyatykh, Russian triple jumper
  1981   – Ned Vizzini, American author and screenwriter (d. 2013)
1982 – Justin Cook, American voice actor and producer
  1982   – Magnus Lindgren, Swedish chef (d. 2012)
1983 – Evgeny Artyukhin, Russian ice hockey player
  1983   – Eric Andre, American comedian
  1983   – Ben Gordon, American basketball player
  1983   – Doug Lynch, Canadian ice hockey player
  1983   – Natalie Pike, Scottish-English model and actress
  1983   – Amanda Righetti, American actress 
1984 – Sean May, American basketball player
  1984   – Arkady Vyatchanin, Russian swimmer
1985 – Rudy Fernández, Spanish basketball player 
  1985   – Dudi Sela, Israeli tennis player
  1985   – Ricardo Vilar, Brazilian footballer
1986 – Eunhyuk, South Korean singer-songwriter and dancer 
  1986   – Cameron Barker, Canadian ice hockey player
  1986   – Maurice Manificat, French skier
  1986   – Aiden McGeady, Scottish-born Irish footballer
  1986   – Alexander Tettey, Norwegian footballer
1987 – Sami Khedira, German footballer
  1987   – McDonald Mariga, Kenyan footballer
  1987   – Cameron Maybin, American baseball player
  1987   – Marcos Vellidis, Greek footballer
  1987   – Sarah Gadon, Canadian actress
1988 – Frank Fielding, English footballer
1989 – Vurnon Anita, Dutch footballer
  1989   – Steven Finn, English cricketer
  1989   – Chris Herd, Australian footballer
1991 – Yui Koike, Japanese singer and actress
1991 – Asia Muhammad, American tennis player
  1991   – Justin O'Neill, Australian rugby league player
  1991   – Jamie Lynn Spears, American actress and singer
  1991   – Marlon Stöckinger, Filipino race car driver
1992 – Lucy May Barker, English actress and singer
  1992   – Christina Metaxa, Cypriot singer-songwriter
  1992   – Ricky Dillon, American youtuber and singer
1993 – Samir Carruthers, English footballer
  1993   – Frank Kaminsky, American basketball player
1994 – Shunsuke Nishikawa, Japanese actor
  1994   – Risako Sugaya, Japanese singer and actress 
1996 – Austin Mahone, American singer-songwriter and actor

Deaths

Pre-1600
 397 – Ambrose, Roman archbishop and saint (b. 338)
 636 – Isidore of Seville, Spanish archbishop and saint (b. 560)
 814 – Plato of Sakkoudion, Byzantine monk and saint (b. 735)
 896 – Formosus, pope of the Catholic Church (b. 816)
 911 – Liu Yin, Chinese warlord and governor (b. 874)
 931 – Kong Xun, Chinese official and governor (b. 884)
 968 – Abu Firas al-Hamdani, Arab prince and poet (b. 932)
 991 – Reginold, bishop of Eichstätt
1284 – Alfonso X, king of Castile and León (b. 1221)
1292 – Nicholas IV, pope of the Catholic Church (b. 1227)
1406 – Robert III, king of Scotland (b.1337)
1483 – Henry Bourchier, 1st Earl of Essex (b. c. 1405)
1536 – Frederick I, Margrave of Brandenburg-Ansbach (b. 1460)
1538 – Elena Glinskaya, Grand Princess and regent of Russia
1588 – Frederick II, king of Denmark and Norway (b. 1534)
1596 – Philip II, Duke of Brunswick-Grubenhagen (b. 1533)

1601–1900
1609 – Carolus Clusius, Flemish botanist, mycologist, and academic (b. 1526)
1617 – John Napier, Scottish mathematician, physicist, and astronomer (b. 1550)
1643 – Simon Episcopius, Dutch theologian and academic (b. 1583)
1661 – Alexander Leslie, 1st Earl of Leven, Scottish field marshal (b. 1580)
1743 – Daniel Neal, English historian and author (b. 1678)
1761 – Théodore Gardelle, Swiss painter (b. 1722)
1766 – John Taylor, English librarian and scholar (b. 1704)
1774 – Oliver Goldsmith, Irish novelist, playwright and poet (b. 1728)
1792 – James Sykes, American lawyer and politician (b. 1725)
1807 – Jérôme Lalande, French astronomer and academic (b. 1732)
1817 – André Masséna, French general (b. 1758)
1841 – William Henry Harrison, American general and politician, 9th President of the United States (b. 1773)
1846 – Solomon Sibley, American lawyer and politician, 1st Mayor of Detroit (b. 1769)
1861 – John McLean, American jurist and politician, 6th United States Postmaster General (b. 1785)
1863 – Ludwig Emil Grimm, German painter and engraver (b. 1790)
1864 – Joseph Pitty Couthouy, American commander and paleontologist (b. 1808)
1870 – Heinrich Gustav Magnus, German chemist and physicist (b. 1802)
1874 – Charles Ernest Beulé, French archaeologist and politician (b. 1826)
1875 – Karl Mauch, German geographer and explorer (b. 1837)
1878 – Richard M. Brewer, American criminal (b. 1850)
1879 – Heinrich Wilhelm Dove, German physicist and meteorologist (b. 1803)
1883 – Peter Cooper, American businessman and philanthropist, founded Cooper Union (b. 1791)
1890 – Pierre-Joseph-Olivier Chauveau, Canadian lawyer and politician, 1st Premier of Quebec (b. 1820)
  1890   – Edmond Hébert, French geologist and academic (b. 1812)

1901–present
1912 – Charles Brantley Aycock, American lawyer and politician, 50th Governor of North Carolina (b. 1859)
  1912   – Isaac K. Funk, American minister, lexicographer, and publisher, co-founded Funk & Wagnalls (b. 1839)
1913 – Emmanouil Argyropoulos, Greek pioneer aviator (b. 1889) 
  1913   – Konstantinos Manos, Greek politician, poet, soldier and sportsman (b. 1869)
1919 – William Crookes, English chemist and physicist (b. 1832)
  1919   – Francisco Marto, Portuguese saint (b. 1908)
1923 – John Venn, English mathematician and philosopher, created the Venn diagram (b. 1834)
1928 – Konstantinos Maleas, Greek painter (b. 1879) 
1929 – Karl Benz, German engineer and businessman, founded Mercedes-Benz (b. 1844)
1931 – André Michelin, French businessman, co-founded the Michelin Tyre Company (b. 1853)
1932 – Wilhelm Ostwald, Latvian-German chemist and academic, Nobel Prize laureate (b. 1853)
1933 – Elizabeth Bacon Custer, American author and educator (b. 1842)
1944 – Morris H. Whitehouse, American architect (b. 1878)
1951 – George Albert Smith, American religious leader, 8th President of The Church of Jesus Christ of Latter-day Saints (b. 1870)
1953 – Carol II of Romania (b. 1893)
1957 – E. Herbert Norman, Canadian historian and diplomat (b. 1909)
1958 – Johnny Stompanato, American soldier and bodyguard (b. 1925)
1961 – Harald Riipalu, Estonian military commander (b. 1912)
  1961   – Simion Stoilow, Romanian mathematician and academic (b. 1873)
1963 – Oskari Tokoi, Finnish socialist and the Chairman of the Senate of Finland (b. 1873)
1967 – Al Lewis, American songwriter (b. 1901)
  1967   – Héctor Scarone, Uruguayan footballer and manager (b. 1898)
1968 – Martin Luther King Jr., American minister and activist, Nobel Prize laureate (assassinated) (b. 1929)
1972 – Adam Clayton Powell Jr., American pastor and politician (b. 1908)
  1972   – Stefan Wolpe, German-American composer and academic (b. 1902)
1976 – Harry Nyquist, Swedish engineer and theorist (b. 1889)
1977 – Andrey Dikiy, Ukrainian-American journalist, historian, and politician (b. 1893)
1979 – Zulfikar Ali Bhutto, Pakistani lawyer and politician, 4th President of Pakistan (b. 1928)
  1979   – Edgar Buchanan, American actor (b. 1903)
1980 – Red Sovine, American singer-songwriter and guitarist (b. 1917)
1983 – Gloria Swanson, American actress (b. 1899)
  1983   – Bernard Vukas, Croatian football player, played for 1953 FIFA's "Rest of the World" team against England at Wembley (b. 1927)
1984 – Oleg Antonov, Russian-Ukrainian engineer and businessman, founded Antonov (b. 1906)
1985 – Kate Roberts, Welsh author and activist (b. 1891)
1987 – C. L. Moore, American author and academic (b. 1911)
  1987   – Chögyam Trungpa, Tibetan guru, poet, and scholar (b. 1939)
  1987   – Sachchidananda Vatsyayan, Indian journalist and author (b. 1911)
1991 – Edmund Adamkiewicz, German footballer (b. 1920)
  1991   – Max Frisch, Swiss playwright and novelist (b. 1911)
  1991   – H. John Heinz III, American soldier and politician (b. 1938)
  1991   – Graham Ingels, American illustrator (b. 1915)
1992 – Yvette Brind'Amour, Canadian actress and director (b. 1918)
  1992   – Jack Hamilton, Australian footballer (b. 1928)
  1992   – Arthur Russell, American singer-songwriter and cellist (b. 1951)
1993 – Alfred Mosher Butts, American game designer, invented Scrabble (b. 1899)
  1993   – Douglas Leopold, Canadian radio and television host (b. 1947)
1995 – Kenny Everett, English radio and television host (b. 1944)
  1995   – Priscilla Lane, American actress (b. 1915)
1996 – Barney Ewell, American runner and long jumper (b. 1918)
  1996   – Boone Guyton, American lieutenant and pilot (b. 1913)
1997 – Leo Picard, German-Israeli geologist and academic (b. 1900)
  1997   – Alparslan Türkeş, Turkish colonel and politician, 39th Deputy Prime Minister of Turkey (b. 1917)
1999 – Lucille Lortel, American actress, artistic director and producer (b. 1900)
  1999   – Early Wynn, American baseball player and sportscaster (b. 1920)
2001 – Liisi Oterma, Finnish astronomer (b. 1915)
  2001   – Ed Roth, American illustrator and engineer (b. 1932)
  2001   – Maury Van Vliet, American-Canadian academic (b. 1913)
2003 – Anthony Caruso, American actor (b. 1916)
2004 – Briek Schotte, Belgian cyclist and coach (b. 1919)
2005 – Edward Bronfman, Canadian businessman and philanthropist (b. 1924)
2007 – Bob Clark, American actor, director, producer, and screenwriter (b. 1941)
  2007   – Karen Spärck Jones, English computer scientist and academic (b. 1935)
2008 – Francis Tucker, South African race car driver (b. 1923)
2009 – Maxine Cooper, American actress, activist and photographer (b. 1924)
2011 – Scott Columbus, American drummer (b. 1956)
  2011   – Juliano Mer-Khamis, Israeli actor, director, and activist (b. 1958)
2012 – A. Dean Byrd, American psychologist and academic (b. 1948)
  2012   – Dimitris Christoulas, Greek pensioner who committed suicide in public (b. 1935) 
  2012   – Anne Karin Elstad, Norwegian author and educator (b. 1938)
  2012   – Claude Miller, French director, producer, and screenwriter (b. 1942)
  2012   – Dubravko Pavličić, Croatian footballer (b. 1967)
  2012   – Roberto Rexach Benítez, Puerto Rican academic and politician, 10th President of the Senate of Puerto Rico (b. 1929)
2013 – Bengt Blomgren, Swedish actor, director, and screenwriter (b. 1923)
  2013   – Roger Ebert, American journalist, critic, and screenwriter (b. 1942)
  2013   – Carmine Infantino, American illustrator (b. 1925)
  2013   – Tommy Tycho, Hungarian-Australian pianist, composer, and conductor (b. 1928)
  2013   – Ian Walsh, Australian rugby player and coach (b. 1933)
  2013   – Noboru Yamaguchi, Japanese author (b. 1972)
2014 – İsmet Atlı, Turkish wrestler and trainer (b. 1931)
  2014   – Wayne Henderson, American trombonist and producer (b. 1939)
  2014   – Kumba Ialá, Bissau-Guinean soldier and politician, President of Guinea-Bissau (b. 1953)
  2014   – Margo MacDonald, Scottish journalist and politician (b. 1943)
  2014   – Curtis Bill Pepper, American journalist and author (b. 1917)
  2014   – Muhammad Qutb, Egyptian author and academic (b. 1919)
2015 – Jamaluddin Jarjis, Malaysian engineer and politician (b. 1951)
  2015   – Elmer Lach, Canadian ice hockey player and coach (b. 1918)
  2015   – Donald N. Levine, American sociologist and academic (b. 1931)
  2015   – Klaus Rifbjerg, Danish author and poet (b. 1931)
2016 – Chus Lampreave, Spanish actress (b. 1930)

Holidays and observances
 Children's Day (Hong Kong, Taiwan)
 Christian feast day:
 Benedict the Moor
 Gaetano Catanoso
 Isidore of Seville
 Martin Luther King Jr. (Episcopal Church (USA))
 Reginald Heber (Anglican Church of Canada)
 Tigernach of Clones
 Plato of Sakkoudion
 April 4 (Eastern Orthodox liturgics)
 Independence Day, celebrates the independence of Senegal from France (1960).
 Peace Day (Angola)
 One of the possible days for Qingming Festival.

References

External links

 BBC: On This Day
 
 Historical Events on April 4

Days of the year
April